Goonengerry  is a small village in New South Wales, Australia, 626 km northeast of Sydney. It is known for its horse riding and National Park.

Before the proclamation of the national park, this area was a state forest.

Important Bird Area
The park lies within the Nightcap Range Important Bird Area, so identified by BirdLife International because it contains the largest known population of Albert's lyrebirds, as well as several other significant bird species.

See also
 Protected areas of New South Wales

References

National parks of New South Wales
Protected areas established in 1999
1999 establishments in Australia
Important Bird Areas of New South Wales